The Capestang bridge over the Canal du Midi at PK 189 at Capestang is a very important structure for those wishing to motor on the canal. It is used as a measuring device as it is the lowest structure on the canal. A British boat builder who builds boats for several of the boat hire companies in France builds their boats to meet these requirements.

Even though rebuilt in recent times, being historic, it was felt necessary to retain its small dimensions.

External links
Detailed drawing of the bridge opening
Two photos

References

Canal du Midi
Bridges in France
Buildings and structures in Hérault
Transport in Occitania (administrative region)